Cabo Mondego is a cape located in central western Portugal bordering the Atlantic Ocean. It is the westernmost point of the Serra da Boa Viagem and is located three kilometers north of Figueira da Foz. It is classified as a natural monument since 2007.

References

Mondego
Geography of Coimbra District
Figueira da Foz